Diabolical rebaptism is the supposed rebaptism of an individual in the name of the devil. It was a common accusation made against the accused at witch trials, but seems to have been essentially the invention of demonologists.

References

External links 
 Engraving showing a diabolical rebatism.

Demonology
Witch hunting